Georgina Abela (born 23 April 1959) is a Maltese singer and musician. She is best known for representing Malta in the Eurovision Song Contest on several occasions, either as an entrant, backing vocalist or composer. She is married to fellow composer Paul Abela. She is popular in her country and she has taken part in many song festivals around the world.

Eurovision

See also
Malta in the Eurovision Song Contest

References

External links
The official site of the Eurovision Song Contest

Living people
Eurovision Song Contest entrants for Malta
Eurovision Song Contest entrants of 1991
1959 births